Officer O'Brien is a 1930 American pre-Code comedy crime film directed by Tay Garnett and starring William Boyd, Ernest Torrence and Dorothy Sebastian. The film's sets were designed by the art director Edward C. Jewell. It was one of the last films produced by Pathé Exchange before it was fully merged into RKO Pictures.

Cast
 William Boyd as 	Bill O'Brien
 Ernest Torrence as John P. O'Brien
 Dorothy Sebastian as Ruth Dale
 Ralf Harolde as Mike Patello
 Paul Hurst as Captain Antrim
 Russell Gleason as Johnny Dale
 Clyde Cook as Limo Lewis
 Arthur Housman as Tony Zurik
 Toyo Fujita as 	Kono 
 Tom Maloney as Detective
 Clarence Wilson as Patello's Attorney

References

Bibliography
 Munden, Kenneth White. The American Film Institute Catalog of Motion Pictures Produced in the United States, Part 1. University of California Press, 1997.

External links
 

1930 films
1930 crime films
1930 comedy films
American crime comedy films
1930s English-language films
1930s crime comedy films
Films directed by Tay Garnett
Pathé Exchange films
American black-and-white films
1930s American films